Favonigobius melanobranchus, the blackthroat goby, is a species of goby native to the Indian Ocean and the western Pacific Ocean as well as being recorded in the Mediterranean Sea. It can reach a length of  TL.

References

melanobranchus
Fish described in 1934
Taxonomy articles created by Polbot